The Gulfport–Biloxi–Pascagoula Combined Statistical Area is made up of five counties in the Mississippi Gulf Coast region. The statistical area consists of the Gulfport–Biloxi Metropolitan Statistical Area and the Pascagoula Metropolitan Statistical Area. The 2010 census placed the CSA population at 411,066, and as of 2019, is estimated to be 442,165. The area was significantly impacted by Hurricane Katrina on August 29, 2005, although population growth has steadily rebounded in recent years.

Counties
Hancock
Harrison
George
Jackson
Stone

Communities

Places with more than 25,000 inhabitants
Gulfport
Biloxi

Places with 10,000 to 25,000 inhabitants
Gautier
Long Beach
Moss Point
Ocean Springs
Pascagoula

Places with 5,000 to 10,000 inhabitants
Bay St. Louis
D'Iberville
Diamondhead CDP
Gulf Hills CDP
Pass Christian
St. Martin CDP
Waveland

Places with less than 5,000 inhabitants
Big Point CDP
Escatawpa CDP
Gulf Park Estates CDP
Helena CDP
Hickory Hills CDP
Hurley CDP
Kiln CDP
Latimer CDP
Lucedale
Lyman CDP
Pearlington CDP
Saucier CDP
Shoreline Park CDP
Vancleave CDP
Wade CDP
Wiggins

Unincorporated places
Agricola
Bayou Caddy
Benndale
Bexley
Bond
Clermont Harbor
Cuevas
De Lisle
Howison
Kreole
Lakeshore
Lizana
McHenry
Merrill
Perkinston

Demographics
As of the census of 2000, there were 396,754 people, 147,600 households, and 105,041 families residing within the CSA. The racial makeup of the CSA was 76.72% White, 18.82% African American, 0.41% Native American, 1.87% Asian, 0.06% Pacific Islander, 0.75% from other races, and 1.37% from two or more races. Hispanic or Latino of any race were 2.26% of the population.

There were 147,600 households, out of which 34.8% had children under the age of 18 living with them, 52.3% were married couples living together, 14.2% had a female householder with no husband present, and 28.8% were non-families. 23.6% of all households were made up of individuals, and 8.1% had someone living alone who was 65 years of age or older. The average household size was 2.66 and the average family size was 3.10.

In the CSA the population was spread out, with 26.7% under the age of 18, 10.1% from 18 to 24, 29.8% from 25 to 44, 22.3% from 45 to 64, and 11.1% who were 65 years of age or older. The median age was 35 years. For every 100 females, there were 98.8 males. For every 100 females age 18 and over, there were 96.8 males.

The median income for a household in the CSA was $35,034, and the median income for a family was $40,617. Males had a median income of $30,985 versus $21,727 for females. The per capita income for the CSA was $16,514.

See also
List of metropolitan areas in Mississippi
List of micropolitan areas in Mississippi
List of cities in Mississippi
List of towns and villages in Mississippi
List of census-designated places in Mississippi
List of United States metropolitan areas

References

Metropolitan areas of Mississippi

Geography of Hancock County, Mississippi
Geography of Harrison County, Mississippi
Geography of George County, Mississippi
Geography of Jackson County, Mississippi
Geography of Stone County, Mississippi
Combined statistical areas of the United States